Ragged School Football Club is an amateur Welsh football team based in Swansea, Wales. They play in the Swansea Senior Football League Division Two, which is in the sixth tier of the Welsh football league system. Their captain Tomas Spooner is the all-team leading goalscorer and also holds the record for most red cards. With his most recent being against Penclawdd 3rds team Right Wing-Back, Rug.

History
Founded in 1949 by Glyn Cole and named after Swansea's Ragged School, the team has seen national success, winning the FAW Trophy four times - the last time in the 2008–09 season when they beat Penycae. After Cole's death the club was run by his nephew, Maurice Hogg, for over fifty years.

They have also been winners of the West Wales Cup seven times.

Additionally they are considered one of the most successful teams in the Swansea Senior Football League, having won the competition's senior cup 14 times and having been crowned champions of the league's top division nine times.

The club withdrew from Division One of the Swansea Senior League in 2015–16 season and rejoined the league in Division Three for the 2017–18 season, finishing as divisional runners-up and gaining promotion to Division Two.

Honours

FAW Trophy – Winners (4): 1989–90, 1998–99, 2000–01, 2008–09
West Wales Intermediate Challenge Cup – Winners (7; joint record): 1967–68, 1980–81, 1990–91, 1992–93, 1994–95, 2000–01, 2010–11
Swansea Senior Football League Division One – Champions (9 including): 1977–78, 1981–82, 1983–84,1991-92  2000–01, 2007–08, 2008–09, 2009–10
Swansea Senior Football League Division One – Runners-up (including): 2006–07, 2013–14 
Swansea Senior Football League Division Three – Runners-up: 2017–18
Swansea Senior Football League Senior Cup – Winners (14 including): 1977–78, 1979–80, 1990–91, 1991–92, 1992–93, 2000–01, 2011–12, 2013–14
Swansea Senior Football League Open Cup – Winners (7):
Swansea Senior Football League Gwalia Cup – Winners (1): 2017–18

References

Bibliography

External links
Official club Twitter

Football clubs in Wales
Sport in Swansea
Association football clubs established in 1949
1949 establishments in Wales
Swansea Senior League clubs
Football clubs in Swansea